Fastida was a king of the Gepidae of the 3rd century. His battle against the Visigoths resulted in defeat, and was chronicled in Getica by Jordanes. He is the first Gepidic king whose name survives.

See also
 Geberic
 Visimar

References

External links
 "The Gepids before Hun Rule" 
 Jordanes, Getica, 97, 100.

Gepid kings
Gepid warriors
Year of birth unknown
Year of death unknown